English diphthongs have undergone many changes since the Old and Middle English periods. The sound changes discussed here involved at least one phoneme which historically was a diphthong.

Old English

Old English diphthongs could be short or long. Both kinds arose from sound changes occurring in Old English itself, although the long forms sometimes also developed from Proto-Germanic diphthongs. They were mostly of the height-harmonic type (both elements at the same height) with the second element further back than the first. The set of diphthongs that occurred depended on dialect (and their exact pronunciation is in any case uncertain). Typical diphthongs are considered to have been as follows:
 high, fully backing, spelt  (found in Anglian dialects, but merged into  in Late West Saxon)
 high, narrower, possibly , spelt  (found in Late West Saxon)
 mid, spelt 
 low, spelt 

In the transition from Old to Middle English, all of these diphthongs generally merged with monophthongs.

Middle English

Development of new diphthongs
Many of these came about through vocalization of the palatal approximant  or the labio-velar approximant  (which was sometimes from an earlier voiced velar fricative , an allophone of ), when they followed a vowel. For example:
 OE dæg ("day") and weg ("way") (where the  had been palatalized to ) became  and 
 OE clawu ("claw") and lagu ("law") became  and 
For example:
 OE streht ("straight") became 
 OE þoht ("thought") became 
The diphthongs that developed by these processes also came to be used in many loanwords, particularly those from Old French.
For a table showing the development of the Middle English diphthongs, see Middle English phonology (diphthong equivalents).

Vein–vain merger
The vowel  was typically represented orthographically with "ei" or "ey" and the vowel  was typically represented orthographically with "ai" or ay". These came to be merged, perhaps by the fourteenth century. The merger is reflected in all dialects of present-day English.

In early Middle English, before the merger, way and day, which came from Old English weġ and dæġ, had  and  respectively. After the merger, vein and vain were homophones, and way and day had the same vowel.

Later (around the 17th century) this diphthong would merge in most dialects with the monophthong of words like pane in the pane–pain merger.

Late Middle English
The English of southeastern England around 1400 had seven diphthongs, of which three ended in a front vowel:
  as in nail, day, whey (the product of the vein–vain merger)
  as in joy, noise, royal, coy
  as in boil, destroy, coin, join

and four ended in a back vowel:
  as in few, dew, ewe, shrewd, neuter, beauty
  as in cause, law, salt, change, chamber, psalm, half, dance, aunt.
  as in low, soul

Typical spellings are as in the examples above. The most common words with ew pronounced  were dew, few, hew, lewd, mew, newt, pewter, sew, shew (show), shrew, shrewd and strew.

Modern English

16th century
Thus, the English of south-eastern England could then have had nine diphthongs.

By the late 16th century, the inventory of diphthongs had been reduced as a result of several developments, all of which took place in the mid-to-late 16th century:
  merged into  and so dew and due became homophones.
For more information, see pane–pain merger, below.

17th century
By the late 17th century, these further developments had taken place in the dialect of south-eastern England:
 The falling diphthong  of due and dew changed to a rising diphthong, which became the sequence . The change did not occur in all dialects, however; see Yod-dropping.
 The diphthong  merged into . Contemporary literature had frequent rhymes such as Mind–join'd in Congreve, join–line in Pope, child–spoil'd in Swift, toils–smiles in Dryden.

Later developments
In the 18th century or later, the monophthongs  (the products of the pane–pain and toe–tow mergers) became diphthongal in Standard English. In RP, the starting point of the latter diphthong has now become more centralized and is commonly written .

They occur in words like near, square and cure.

General American does not have the centering diphthongs (at least, not as independent phonemes). For more information, see English phonology (vowels).

Variation in present-day English

Coil–curl merger

The coil–curl or oil–earl merger is a vowel merger that historically occurred in some non-rhotic dialects of American English, due to an up-gliding  vowel.

Cot–coat merger

This merger can also be found in some broad Central Belt Scottish English accents.

Line–loin merger
The line–loin merger is a merger between the diphthongs  and  that occurs in some accents of Southern English English, Hiberno-English, Newfoundland English, and Caribbean English. Pairs like line and loin, bile and boil, imply and employ are homophones in merging accents.

Long mid mergers
The earliest stage of Early Modern English had a contrast between the long mid monophthongs  (as in pane and toe respectively) and the diphthongs  (as in pain and tow respectively). In the vast majority of Modern English accents these have been merged, so that the pairs pane–pain and toe–tow are homophones. These mergers are grouped together by Wells as the long mid mergers.

Pane–pain merger
The pane–pain merger is a merger of the long mid monophthong  and the diphthong  that occurs in most dialects of English. In the vast majority of Modern English accents the vowels have been merged; whether the outcome is monophthongal or diphthongal depends on the accent. But in a few regional accents, including some in East Anglia, South Wales, and even Newfoundland, the merger has not gone through (at least not completely), so that pairs like pane/pain are distinct.

In accents that preserve the distinction, the phoneme  is usually represented by the spellings ai, ay, ei and ey as in day, play, rain, pain, maid, rein, they etc. and the phoneme  is usually represented by aCe as in pane, plane, lane, late etc. and sometimes by é and e as in re, café, Santa Fe etc.

Toe–tow merger

The merger occurs in the vast majority of Modern English accents; whether the outcome is monophthongal or diphthongal depends on the accent. But in a few regional accents, including some in Northern England, East Anglia and South Wales, the merger has not gone through (at least not completely), so that pairs like toe and tow, moan and mown, groan and grown, sole and soul, throne and thrown are distinct.

In 19th century England, the distinction was still very widespread; the main areas with the merger were in the northern Home Counties and parts of the Midlands.

The distinction is most often preserved in East Anglian accents, especially in Norfolk. Peter Trudgill discusses this distinction, and states that "...until very recently, all Norfolk English speakers consistently and automatically maintained the nose-knows distinction... In the 1940s and 1950s, it was therefore a totally unremarkable feature of Norfolk English shared by all speakers, and therefore of no salience whatsoever."

Reports of Maine English in the 1970s reported a similar toad-towed distinction among older speakers, but was lost in subsequent generations.

In accents that preserve the distinction, the phoneme descended from Early Modern English  is usually represented by the spellings ou, and ow as in soul, dough, tow, know, though etc. or through L-vocalization as in bolt, cold, folk, roll etc., while that descended from Early Modern English  is usually represented by oa, oe, or oCe as in boat, road, toe, doe, home, hose, go, tone etc.

This merger did not occur before r originally, and only later occurred (relatively recently) as the horse–hoarse merger. This merger is not universal, however, and thus words with our and oar may not sound the same as words with or in some dialects.

Mare–mayor merger

The mare–mayor merger occurs in many varieties of British English, in the Philadelphia dialect, and the Baltimore dialect. The process has bisyllabic  pronounced as the centering diphthong  in many words.

The best-known examples are mayonnaise and graham (a homophone of gram).

Pride–proud merger
The pride–proud merger is a merger of the diphthongs  and  before voiced consonants into monophthongal  occurring for some speakers of African American Vernacular English making pride and proud, dine and down, find and found etc. homophones.

Rod–ride merger

Smoothing of 
As a result, "scientific" is pronounced  with three syllables and "science" is pronounced  with one syllable.

See also
 Phonological history of English
 Phonological history of English vowels
 Trisyllabic laxing
 Great Vowel Shift

Notes

References

Bibliography

 
 
 
 
 
 
 
 

Splits and mergers in English phonology
English phonology
History of the English language